James Wilson McHenry was mayor of Murray, Utah from 1916 to 1917.  McHenry was born in Nashville, Tennessee and moved to Murray in 1881. He worked for the LDS Church supervising its tithing yard in Salt Lake City.
He helped organize the Murray Commercial Club and later formed the Salt Lake Commercial Club. He later oversaw the foundation of a West Jordan sugar beet factory.

McHenry’s tenure in office was noted for the expansion of the cities’ sewer and irrigation lines. McHenry, previous to being elected, pushed for municipally-owned power generation.

References 

1864 births
1931 deaths
Latter Day Saints from Tennessee
Mayors of Murray, Utah
People of Utah Territory
Politicians from Nashville, Tennessee
Latter Day Saints from Utah